The 2014 Central Arkansas Bears football team represented the University of Central Arkansas in the 2014 NCAA Division I FCS football season. The Bears were led by first-year head coach Steve Campbell and played their home games at Estes Stadium. They are a member of the Southland Conference.  The Bears finished the season 6–6 overall and 5–3 in conference play to finish in a three way tie for third place.

Schedule

References

Central Arkansas
Central Arkansas Bears football seasons
Central Arkansas Bears football